New York Movie is an oil on canvas painting by American Painter Edward Hopper. The painting was begun in December of 1938 and finished in January of 1939. Measuring 32 1/4 x 40 1/8", New York Movie depicts a nearly empty movie theater occupied with a few scattered moviegoers and a pensive usherette lost in her thoughts. Praised for its brilliant portrayal of multiple light sources, New York Movie is one of Hopper's well-regarded works. Despite the fact that the movie in the painting itself is not known, Hopper's wife and fellow painter Josephine Hopper wrote in her notes on New York Movie that the image represents fragments of snow-covered mountains.

Inspiration 
New York Movie is a composite painting, meaning that it combines several separate sources into a single work. As she did for many of his paintings, Josephine Hopper, a famous painter in her own right for years before her marriage to Hopper, served as a muse for New York Movie, having posed under a lamp in the hall of his apartment. As with many of his other works, Hopper did not attempt to paint her with any obvious sexual appeal, as he hoped with his work to paint women with complete honesty towards their situation, both exterior and interior. Some claim that New York Movie is a counterpart to Édouard Manet's A Bar at the Folies-Bergère, with the usherette a modern representation of the waitress.

While the theater depicted in New York Movie is entirely designed by him, he took inspiration from the Palace Theatre (New York City), the Lunt-Fontanne Theatre (at the time known as the Globe Theatre), the Republic Theater (now known as the New Victory Theater, and the Strand Theatre (Manhattan), making over fifty sketches of the theaters before he began the project. Hopper was fascinated by film, and it is said that, when experiencing creative block, he would stay at the theater all day. Despite his fascination with film, New York Movie itself depicts an isolation and melancholy, even though theaters at the time sat up to thousands. Furthermore, some critics argue that the usherette is lost in her imagination only as a result of her separation from the movie currently playing, a sleight against movie going audiences of the time period, and that her separation incurs sympathy within the viewer. Others claim that New York Movie and other paintings of city life are Hopper's ode to the warmth and endurance of the human spirit in the midst of the dehumanizing existence that is mass living. Hopper also drew inspiration from Edgar Degas—specifically Interior—in terms of the composition of the lighting as well as the overall nocturnal nature of the work.

Exhibition history 
New York Movie has been hung in both the Museum of Modern Art and the Whitney Museum of American Art as part of several large Edward Hopper exhibitions under the care of his estate’s curator, Gail Levin. “Edward Hopper: The Art and the Artist” was an exhibition of the artist’s work, including New York Movie, that began at the Whitney and traveled to the Hayward Gallery in London, the Stedelijk Museum Amsterdam, the Städtische Kunsthalle in Düsseldorf, The Art Institute of Chicago, and the San Francisco Museum of Modern Art. New York Movie has also been included in Edward Hopper retrospectives at the Whitney, the Art Institute of Chicago, the Detroit Institute of Arts, and the St. Louis Art Museum.

Through an anonymous donation, "New York Movie" is currently hanging in the Alfred H. Barr, Jr. Galleries in the Museum of Modern Art.

In popular culture 
New York Movie has been influential in both the fields of poetry and film.

Concerning poetry, a number of poets have used Hopper's portrayal entertainment and the reflective nature of the usherette for their own works. American poet Joseph Stanton wrote a poem titled “Edward Hopper’s New York Movie” in his collection of poetry Imaginary Museum: Poems on Art. Gerald Locklin, English poet and professor at California State University, also wrote a poem titled "edward hopper; new york movie, 1939. More recently, poet Jacks DeWitt published a poem in 2012 titled Hopper: New York Movie 

The painting is specifically noted for its shadows and use of lighting, and, as many of his works, New York Movie is suggested to be an inspiration for many film noir movies, and films depicting female isolation. Sam Mendes specifically references Edward Hopper’s New York Movie in his filming of Road to Perdition, noting that the lighting of the scene is a source of poetry within the painting and claiming that the loneliness and desolation that results from the partial obscureness of her face was an inspiration for the film. Fat City (1972) was another film influenced by New York Movie, as production designer Richard Sylbert used the painting, along with Nighthawks, for the color scheme of the movie.

References 

1939 paintings 
Paintings by Edward Hopper 
Paintings in the collection of the Museum of Modern Art (New York City)
Oil on canvas paintings